Ivo de Vesci, sometimes spelt Vescy and first name sometimes Yves, was a prominent 11th-century English noble. He obtained lands and the lordship of Alnwick in Northumberland from King William II of England. He was also given lands in Malton, Yorkshire. It is not known whether he is the son or kinsman of the Robert de Veci who participated in the Norman conquest of England and was rewarded with great estates in the counties of Northampton, Warwick and Lincoln.

Marriage and issue
He married Alda Tyson, daughter of William Tyson, the former lord of Alnwick. They had issue:
Beatrix de Vesci, died c.1130. She married Eustace Fitz John (d 1157), Constable of Chestershire and Knaresborough. By his marriage to Beatrix, Ivo gained the Baronies of Malton and Alnwick.

References

Battle Abbey Roll - Vescy
https://familysearch.org/photos/artifacts/11019944

11th-century English landowners
Ivo
William II of England